Decorsea is a genus of legume in the family Fabaceae. 

It contains the following species:
 Decorsea dinteri
 Decorsea schlechteri

References 

Phaseoleae
Taxonomy articles created by Polbot
Fabaceae genera